Die zwei Leben des Daniel Shore (The Two Lives of Daniel Shore) is a 2009 German film by Michael Dreher; written by him and produced by Karim Debbagh, Rüdiger Heinze, Rainer Kölmel and Stefan Sporbert. It stars Nikolai Kinski, Katharina Schüttler, Morjana Alaoui and Sean Gullette. The film is Michael Dreher's feature film debut and had its premiere at the 44th Hof International Film Festival.

Plot
Daniel Shore, a 28-year-old German American, is about to spend a few days in the flat of his deceased grandmother. Since his return from Morocco, his mental state has become somewhat unstable.
The trip to Morocco was all about getting away from the work-related troubles and his whole miserable life, but now there is even more to worry about, because in Morocco a boy was killed, and Daniel is thinking he might have become an accessory to the crime. Even in the new surrounding, Daniel is haunted by images of what has happened, until everyday situations push him over the edge and soon the past and present become an indistinct blur.

Cast
 Nikolai Kinski as Daniel Shore
 Katharina Schüttler as Elli
 Morjana Alaoui as Imane
 Sean Gullette as Henry Porter
 Judith Engel as Miss Kowalski
 Matthias Matschke as Günther Feige
 Bernd Tauber as Prof. Hübner
 Stefan Lampadius as Gatekeeper
 Meryam Raoui as Imane's friend
 Driss Roukhe as Commandant

Distribution and response
The film premiered on October 29, 2009 at the Hof International Film Festival and was commercially released in Germany on February 11, 2010.

Although there was no international release date up to now, Twitch Film reviewed the trailer of the movie.

References

External links
 
 

2009 films
2009 thriller drama films
2000s German-language films
German thriller drama films
2000s German films